Able UK is a British industrial services company specialising in decommissioning of ships and offshore installations.

Overview

Able UK is a British industrial services company, operating primarily in the marine decommissioning and recycling business. As of 2014 the company has a specialised dry dock with associated decommissioning facilities including landfill at Seaton (TERRC, Teesside Environmental Reclamation & Recycling Centre) with a  entrance width capable of handling offshore oil equipment including steel jackets of fixed platforms, heavy-lift ship, and other large ships including aircraft carrier sized vessels. The company also undertakes general demolition work.

In addition to the dock facility at Seaton, Able UK also has (as of 2014) sites with port facilities at or near Billingham (Billingham Reach, quay and industrial estate); Port Clarence (Clarence Port, River Tees bankside development land); and at Middlesbrough (Middlesbrough Port, River Tees quayside north with fabrication facilities; also at the former South Tees Recycling Centre.).

The company has non-port sites at or near (as of 2014): Barnby Dun (the former Thorpe Marsh Power Station); and at Seaton (Seaton Meadows landfill site).

As of 2014 Able UK is also promoting and planning two sites in the north of Lincolnshire, near the banks of the Humber Estuary. ABLE Logistics Park received planning permission in 2013. ABLE Marine Energy Park received local planning permission in 2013, and sought a Development Consent Order in 2014; a planning decision was delayed due to objections from ABP, which were judicially rejected in 2015.

History

Able UK was founded in 1966 by Peter Stephenson.

In 1995 Able acquired the land of the closed Thorpe Marsh Power Station. In 1996 Able acquired the dock at Graythorp, renaming it the  TERRC (Teesside Environmental Reclamation and Recycling Centre) together with the nearby Seaton Meadows landfill site.

In 2000 Able acquired a fabrication facility in Middlesbrough (formerly Davy Offshore Modules, later SLP Engineering, and Odebrecht.) renaming it Able Middlesbrough Port.

In 2003 the TERRC facility became the subject of controversy when Able obtained a £11 million contract from the United States Maritime Administration to dismantle 13 former US navy ships (known as the Ghost Ships). Due to the presence of asbestos and polychlorinated biphenyls in the ships the action was opposed by some Hartlepool residents and environmental groups.

Able acquired a license to carry out the work from the Environment Agency in 2008. The delays caused by the objections to the process caused Able to lose the US contract for 9 of the 13 ships. In 2007 Able was fined £20,000 for failing to follow proper procedures when disposing of asbestos. By 2009 the four US ships that had been received at the site, together with the former French aircraft carrier Clemenceau, were sealed inside the dry dock, which was drained, and the ships scrapped.  Other constructions decommissioned at the same time included the former jacket of an installation from the North West Hutton Oilfield. Dismantling work was completed in 2011.

The TERRC site was again the subject of a planning conflict in 2012 when Hartlepool Borough Council rejected a planning submission (to extend the height Seaton Meadows landfill) made in an attempt to prevent spontaneous combustion of refuse which had been occurring.

During 2009/2010 Able published plans for a site on the south Humber Estuary bank to provide a large logistics facility and facilities for wind farm equipment manufacture and installation; The Able Logistics Park received planning permission in 2013, The £450 million estuary side port development  Able Marine Energy Park (AMEP) received planning consent in December 2013, after having been delayed due to concerns over wildlife impact.

In 2014 proceedings for a Development Consent Order for the AMEP plan were begun. Associated British Ports (ABP) submitted two petitions: an objection and an alternative petition for amendment, both based on objections to compulsory purchase of land  it had recently announced the intention to develop for a hydrocarbon importation facility, the Immingham Western Deepwater Jetty (IWDJ). ABP was subsequently accused of filing wrecking amendments at the initial hearings. At hearings in April 2014 ABP's petitions of objections were found to be valid, requiring the development case to be heard by a committee of MPs. By July 2014 other issues with the plan had been withdrawn, with the ABP petitions to be heard at an inquiry in October. In August 2014 work began on a £60 million environmental remediation scheme for AMEP to create an alternative wading bird habitats on the banks of the Humber, enabling works began for the AMEP development in the same month, with £15 million funding coming from a government grant. In October 2014 the parliamentary committee rejected ABP's petitions, and in February 2015 ABP ended its legal opposition to the plans following rejection of a judicial review of the planning decision.

In mid 2015 DONG Energy agreed to a MOU with Able over the construction of an offshore wind operations base at the planned Able Marine Energy Park; however, in mid-2016 DONG withdrew from plans to use the site as an operations hub, following an internal review that concluded the site would not be in operation in time for its UK east coast wind farm plans.

Notes

References

Maps

Further reading

External links

 

Companies based in County Durham
Waste management companies of the United Kingdom
Ship breaking
Waste companies established in 1966